S Arae (S Ara) is an RR Lyrae-type pulsating variable star in the constellation of Ara. It has an apparent visual magnitude which varies between 9.92 and 11.24 during its 10.85-hour pulsation period, and it exhibits the Blazhko effect.

References

Ara (constellation)
RR Lyrae variables
A-type bright giants
088064
Arae, S
Durchmusterung objects